Almansa is a Spanish town and municipality in the province of Albacete, part of the autonomous community of Castile-La Mancha. The name "Almansa" stems from the Arabic  (al-manṣaf), "half way of the road". The municipality borders with Alicante, Valencia and Murcia. Almansa is famous for its Moros y cristianos festival from celebrated from 1 to 6 May.

Almansa is built at the foot of a white limestone crag, which is surmounted by a Moorish castle, and rises abruptly in the midst of a fertile and irrigated plain. Annual reenactments of that battle have been formally listed in the Spanish cultural register.

The Sierra del Mugrón is located within the Almansa city limits.

Main sights 

The main sightseeing attraction is the 14th-century Castle of Almansa.

There are other important monuments, such as:
Church of la Asunción (16th-19th century)
Palace of Los Condes de Cirat (16th century), today the Town  Hall
Church of the Agustinas Convent (18th century)
The Convent of San Francisco (17th century)
Clock Tower (1780)

8 km from the city is the  reservoir of Almansa,  built in 1584. This reservoir is the oldest one in Europe. 12 km from the city is the Sanctuary of Our Lady of Belen (17th century).

Camino de Santiago 

Two pilgrim routes on the Camino de Santiago meet in Almansa.  From the south comes the Camino de la Lana and from the east, the Camino de Levante.  The Camino de la Lana joins Alicante with Burgos, and the Camino de Levante joins Valencia with Zamora.

See also 
 Almanza in the province of León

References

External links 
  Portal of Almansa

 
Municipalities of the Province of Albacete